This is a list of mayors of Esztergom, Hungary.

Communist Hungary

Mayors since 1990

References

Dr. Magyar György: Esztergom polgármesterei 1808-1990
Dr. Bády István - A bazilika árnyékában - Egy polgármester visszanéz (1989)
Pifkó Péter – Zachar Anna – Esztergom helytörténeti kronológiája a kezdetektől 1950-ig
Esztergom a török után és  a polgárosodás útján
Esztergom Trianon után
Esztergom a második világháború után

Mayors
Esztergom